1340 Yvette, provisional designation , is a carbonaceous Themistian asteroid from the outer regions of the asteroid belt, approximately 29 kilometers in diameter. It was discovered on 27 December 1934, by astronomer Louis Boyer at the Algiers Observatory, who named it after his niece, Yvette.

Orbit and classification 

Yvette is a Themistian asteroid that belongs to the Themis family, a very large family of nearly 5,000 member asteroids, named after 24 Themis. It orbits the Sun in the outer main belt at a distance of 2.8–3.6 AU once every 5 years and 8 months (2,075 days; semi-major axis of 3.18 AU). Its orbit has an eccentricity of 0.13 and an inclination of 0° with respect to the ecliptic.

The body's observation arc begins with its official discovery observation at Algiers in 1934.

Physical characteristics 

Yvette has been characterized as a carbonaceous C-type asteroid by Pan-STARRS photometric survey, in line with the overall spectral type of the Themis family.

Rotation period 

Published in 2004, a first rotational lightcurve of Yvette was obtained from photometric observations by Brazilian and Argentinian astronomers. Lightcurve analysis gave a relatively short rotation period of 3.525 hours with a brightness amplitude of 0.16 magnitude.

Diameter and albedo 

According to the surveys carried out by the Infrared Astronomical Satellite IRAS, the Japanese Akari satellite and the NEOWISE mission of NASA's Wide-field Infrared Survey Explorer, Yvette measures between 25.87 and 33.061 kilometers in diameter and its surface has an albedo between 0.0587 and 0.0958.

The Collaborative Asteroid Lightcurve Link adopts the results obtained by IRAS, that is an albedo of 0.0958 and a diameter of 25.87 kilometers based on an absolute magnitude of 11.1.

Naming 

This minor planet was named by the discoverer in honor of his niece, Yvette. The official naming citation was mentioned in The Names of the Minor Planets by Paul Herget in 1955.

References

External links 
 Asteroid Lightcurve Database (LCDB), query form (info )
 Dictionary of Minor Planet Names, Google books
 Asteroids and comets rotation curves, CdR – Observatoire de Genève, Raoul Behrend
 Discovery Circumstances: Numbered Minor Planets (1)-(5000) – Minor Planet Center
 
 

001340
Discoveries by Louis Boyer (astronomer)
Named minor planets
19341227